Speed Racer: Original Motion Picture Score is the soundtrack of the film of the same name, which is based on the Japanese anime and manga series Speed Racer by Tatsunoko Productions. The score was composed by Michael Giacchino. It was originally released on May 6, 2008 by Varèse Sarabande. In Japan, it was released by Geneon Entertainment on June 25, 2008.

The orchestral score is performed by Hollywood Studio Symphony with American composer Tim Simonec conducting. Along with it an updated version of the "Go, Speed Racer, Go" theme song performed by Ali Dee and the Deekompressors was used in the film's ending credits. In 2007, its rights were purchased by The Wachowskis, the writer, producers and film's directors, for use in the film. "Go, Speed Racer, Go" was released as a single in the same day of soundtrack's release. The soundtrack overall has been well received by music critics.

Track listing

Reception

The score received favorable responses. Allmusic stated it has "enough emotive interludes and lounge-tinged asides to render Austin Powers a period drama", while praised as "one of the most satisfying audio jumps from TV to the big screen since Danny Elfman's score for 1989's Michael Keaton-era Batman." Soundtrack.net said Giacchino "organically rearranging the little pieces as various leitmotifs throughout the movie" and "mines the entire late 60's for other pastiches", calling it "one of the best scores of the year." Giacchino remained "fairly faithful to the original score from the TV-series", and he was "able to inject his own sense of retro-flair that makes Speed Racer one score you might consider racing out to get", according to Tracksounds.com. The New York Times noted "some of what you see in Speed Racer is indeed beautiful (as is the slyly old-fashioned orchestral score by Michael Giacchino)."

Film Music Magazine qualified it "as energizing a ride as any musically re-tooled cartoon standard can hope for", adding it is "the musical equivalent of the film – garishly colorful, swingingly energetic – and a whole lot more sensical than the movie itself." It was described as "the real gusto" of the film by Empire. While praised Giacchino incorporation of the original themes, Daniel Schweiger of iF Magazine said it doesn't mean it "is lacking his own style." Schweiger stated the soundtrack "triumphs as the musical equivalent of the film- garishly colorful, swingingly energetic- and a whole lot more sensical than the movie itself." On the other hand, Filmtracks.com remarked it "start well, interestingly, with 'I Am Speed'" and that fans of the original show's music will appreciate the score. However, he criticized it for being "simply too explosively loud and incessantly enthusiastic to tolerate for lengthy periods of time", comparing it to "television commercials who try to sell you household cleaning products while shouting their praise for the item and never yielding to take a breath."

References

External links
Speed Racer soundtrack - official website

Speed Racer
2008 soundtrack albums
Michael Giacchino soundtracks
Action film soundtracks
Comedy film soundtracks